Cama de Gato (English title: Cat's Cradle) is a Brazilian telenovela produced and broadcast by TV Globo in 2009 and 2010.

Plot
Gustavo, once a poor, kindhearted youngster, is now a successful entrepreneur in the perfume business but has turned cruel, arrogant, and miserable. Alcino, his best friend and business partner, helped him achieve his present success. When Alcino finds out that has a fatal disease and has a few months to live, he decides to play a prank on Gustavo to help him rediscover the decent man he once was and the joy of living he once possessed. Gustavo is married to Veronica, a rich, selfish, spoiled, and ambitious woman who has never loved her husband. Alcino's prank takes an unexpected turn when Veronica, the story's antagonist, interferes, manipulates the surprise, and makes Gustavo lose almost everything after being taken for dead and accused of a crime. While trying to pick up the pieces of his life, Gustavo meets Rose, a simple, hard-working woman who raises four kids by herself with great spirit and optimism. Because of her good heart, she starts to help Gustavo to put his life back together. Gradually, Gustavo and Rose develop feeling for each other, leading him to rediscover his humanity through the hands of this newfound love.

Cast 

Guest actors

Guest actresses

Special guest star

Supporting cast

International Exhibition

  – Globo
  – SIC
  – RTP Internacional
  – DigitAlb
  – Teletica
  – Televicientro
  – WAPA-TV
  – Canal 13
  – Ecuavisa
  – Canal Unitel
  – Teledoce
  – Ràdio i Televisió d'Andorra
  – ATV
  – TCS Canal 4
  – SNT
  – Vica TV
  – Viva
  – Tele Antillas Canal 2
  – STV-Soico
  – France Ô
  – TeleSUR
  – TV3
  – RAI
  – ZTV
  – TV Globo Internacional
  – TV Globo Internacional
  – Vision 2 Drama
  – Nueve
  – Viva
  – 2M
  – Canal 2 Internacional
  – Kenya
  – Uganda

Soundtrack

National 
 Capa: Camila Pitanga
 "Porque Eu Sei Que é Amor" - Titãs
 "Pra Você Guardei Amor" - Nando Reis e Ana Cañas
 "Um Dia, um Adeus" - Vanessa da Mata 
 "Seu Olhar (ao vivo)" - Seu Jorge 
 "Linda Rosa" - Maria Gadú 
 "Sou Eu" - Diogo Nogueira
 "Pedindo Pra Voltar" - Marisa Monte
 "Pot-pourri: Beija-flor/Mel na Sua Boca" - Marina Lima
 "O Mundo" - Moska 
 "Eu Não Sou Santo" - Exaltasamba 
 "Vem Comigo Que Eu Te Levo Pro Céu" - Marcelo D2 
 "Pelo Avesso" - Titãs
 "La Plata" - Jota Quest (Tema de Verônica)
 "Amar é Perdoar (Don't Know Why)" - Fábio Jr.
 "Odeon" - Fernanda Takai 
 "Toda Criança Quer" - Palavra Cantada

2009 telenovelas
2009 Brazilian television series debuts
2010 Brazilian television series endings
Brazilian telenovelas
TV Globo telenovelas
Portuguese-language telenovelas
Television shows set in Rio de Janeiro (city)